Aylin Kösetürk (born 5 August 1993) is an Austrian fashion model of Turkish descent.  Kösetürk is best known for being the winner of the second season of Austria's Next Topmodel which was held in 2009. After that she had to continue her work as a waitress.

See also
Austria's Next Topmodel, Cycle 2

References

External links
Wienermodels: Aylin

1993 births
Living people
Austrian people of Turkish descent
Austrian female models
Next Top Model winners
Models from Vienna